Reina de Mi Tierra 2011, the 4th competition, will be held on October, 2011. Where Mireya Levi, from Tulcán will crown her successor as Reina de Mi Tierra 2011.

The winner of Reina de Mi Tierra will represent her province at Miss Ecuador 2012 directly without castings. Also, in the final night will have the Top 24 and then Top 6 and a Top 3.

Results

Placements

Contestants
As of September 24, 2011, 60 contestants have been confirmed.

References

External links
 Official Reina de Mi Tierra website

2012 beauty pageants
Beauty pageants in Ecuador